Hum Dono is a Hindi songs countdown show aired on Sahara One in 2000. The series follows a story of two people.

Plot

Rahul and Anjali
Rahul (R. Madhavan) and Anjali (Trupti Toradmal) wins a world tour in a contest together, but they are completely stranger to each other. While they are on tour in London, Australia and Singapore, they get the time to know each other. Rahul is a free spirited guy, while Anjali is a reserved person. But gradually they bond a friendship which is established on some comic situation. Later Rahul falls for Anajli but Anjali still in denial that he loves Rahul.
After Rahul pulling some pranks to her, Anjali admits that she loves him and together they complete their tour.

Vikram/Ajay and Piyasha/Amita
Piyasha (Malini Sharma) is on world tour, during her tour she meets Vikram (Vishal Singh) the two becomes friends. Together they travel Rome, Switzerland and Paris. During their tour Piyasha told Vikram that her real name is Amita and she runaway from her home, Vikram accepts this and said that it doesn't change her what she is. Soon after this Piyasha found out that Vikram's real name is Ajay Sood, a detective who was hired by her father to keep an eye on him. After learning this Piyasha got angry on him, but Vikram explains her that started liking her therefore he didn't told her. After some hilarious and comic situations Vikram wins her heart and together they enjoy their tour together.

Cast
R. Madhavan .... Rahul
Trupti Toradmal.... Anjali
Vishal Singh .... Vikram/Ajay
Malini Sharma .... Piyasha/Amita

Indian television series